The 2023–24 international cricket season is scheduled to take place from September 2023 to April 2024. The 2023 Cricket World Cup is scheduled to take place in India in October and November.

Season overview

September

2023 Asia Cup

October

2023 Cricket World Cup

References

 

2023 in cricket
2024 in cricket